Strulovitch is a surname.

People with this surname include:

 Lance Strulovitch (born 1998), Canadian racecar driver better known as Lance Stroll
 Lawrence Sheldon Strulovitch (born 1959), Canadian billionaire businessman better known as Lawrence Stroll
 Sidney "Cy" Strulovitch (1925–2020), Canadian basketball player and Olympian